

Events
Boston mobster Philip Buccola flees the country to escape indictment for tax evasion.  Before leaving the U.S., he turns over his criminal operations to mobster Raymond Patriarca, Sr.  Patriarca would eventually transform this confederation of Italian street gangs into the Patriarca crime family.
February 28 – Abraham Davidian is shot to death in Fresno, California while waiting to testify in a major West Coast narcotics investigation.
April 6 – Kansas City, Missouri mob boss Charles Binaggio and his bodyguard, Charles Gargotta, are found shot to death.  Binaggio would be succeeded by Anthony Gizzo.
May 26 – The Senate Special Committee to Investigate Organized Crime in Interstate Commerce (later to be known as the Kefauver Committee) opens hearings in Miami, Florida.  Committee hearings would continue in major cities throughout the country until August 17, 1951.
June 5 – James Lumia, Florida organized crime figure, is gunned down on a street corner.  The hit is believed to be ordered by Santo Trafficante, Sr.
July 5 – The bandit and separatist Salvatore Giuliano is killed in Castelvetrano, Sicily. According to police, carabinieri captain Antonio Perenze shot and killed Guilano as he was resisting arrest. However, Gaspare Pisciotta, Giuliano's lieutenant, would later claim that he killed Giuliano on orders from Mario Scelba, then Italian Minister of the Interior.  Pisciotta would say that police promised him a pardon and a reward if he killed Giuliano.
September 25 – William Drury, a former acting police captain in Chicago, and Marvin Bas, attorney for the Republican nominee for Cook County Sheriff, are shot to death at separate locations in Chicago. Police believe the two men were murdered due to information they provided the Kefauver Committee on organized crime activities in Chicago. Chicago Outfit mobsters Paul Ricca and Louis Campagna would be held for questioning in the murder, but due to lack of evidence are never formally charged.

Births
Carlos Lehder, Medellín Cartel co-founder
Joseph Tangorra, Lucchese crime family, Capo

Deaths
Marvin Bas, Chicago syndicate defence lawyer
Julius Benvenuti, Chicago syndicate gambling racketeer and operator of the Buffalo-Erie policy wheel
February 28 – Abraham Davidian, government witness
April 5 – Charles Binaggio, Kansas City crime family leader
April 6 – Charles Gargotta, bodyguard to Charles Binaggio
June 5 – James Lumia, Tampa crime family leader

References

Organized crime
Years in organized crime